Mildred C. Crump (born 1938) was a councilperson on the Municipal Council of Newark from 1994-1998 and again from 2006-2021, and is the first Black woman to serve on the city's governing body. She was the first African American Braille teacher in New Jersey. InsiderNJ called her "legendary". Former Mayor Luis A. Quintana said of her “I see her as someone who was a pioneer as an African-American female".

Early life 
Crump was born in Detroit to Edgar Coleman and Mattie Lee Johnson. She graduated from Wayne State University. She became the first African-American Braille teacher in the City of Detroit. She moved to New Jersey in 1965 and she became the first African-American Braille teacher in the state. She received her master's degree from Rutgers University–Newark in Public Administration. She was a teacher and consultant for many years with the Commission for the Blind and Visually Impaired. She was married to Cecil Crump with whom she had two children.

Political career 
Crump ran for Council election as early as 1989 on a platform of fair taxation, help for tenants, and better education.  She was the first Black woman to serve on the Municipal Council when she was elected in 1994. Crump was elected on June 14, 1994, beating Donald Kofi Tucker in a run off election. She was the first woman to serve as council president for Newark, New Jersey, serving from 2006-2010 and from 2013–2021. She ran for Mayor in 1998, trying to call attention to crime, school failure, and corruption under Sharpe James. She served on the council for 19 total years before she resigned in 2021, as Councilman-At-Large (1994-1998, 2006–2021). She served under Mayors Sharpe James, Cory Booker, and Ras Baraka. After her resignation the Council voted to give the seat to her son Larry Crump.

She received awards such as the Susan Burgess Memorial Award for Exemplary Leadership from the National Democratic Municipal Officials. She received a Public Service Lifetime Achievement Award from the NJ chapter of the American Society for Public Administration. She was on InsiderNJ's 2021 African American Power List. She is in the New Jersey State League of Municipalities Elected Officials Hall of Fame.

Other accomplishments 
Crump founded Newark Women's Conference, Inc., an organization whose purpose is to promote the empowerment of women in Newark and vicinity. She also appeared on TV as host of “Straight Talk with Mildred Crump”. She was a founding member of the New Jersey Coalition of 100 Black Women, Inc., the National Political Congress for Black Women of Newark, and the Global Women's Leadership Collaborative of New Jersey. She is a past President and member of the board of trustees for Integrity House, Inc., Vice-chairperson of the Steering Committee of the Bridge to Recovery, charter member of the National Museum of African American History and Culture in Washington D.C., past chairman of the Board of Directors, Habitat for Humanity, Newark and  Golden Heritage Life Member of the Newark Branch NAACP.

References 

1938 births
Living people
Members of the Municipal Council of Newark
Rutgers University–Newark alumni
Wayne State University alumni
African-American women in politics